The National Olympic Committee and Sports Confederation of Denmark (DIF) is the National Olympic Committee representing Denmark.

List of presidents
The following is a list of presidents since its creation in 1905.

Member federations
The Danish National Federations are the organizations that coordinate all aspects of their individual sports. They are responsible for training, competition and development of their sports. There are currently 32 Olympic Summer and 4 Winter Sport Federations in Denmark.

See also
Denmark at the Olympics

References

External links
 Official website

Denmark
Denmark at the Olympics
Olympic
1905 establishments in Denmark

Sports organizations established in 1905